HMS Harrier was a Cruizer-class brig-sloop launched in 1804. She took part in several notable actions before she was lost in March 1809, presumed foundered.

Career
Harrier was commissioned in November 1804 under Commander William Woodridge, who sailed her for the East Indies on 24 December 1804. In 1805 Commander Edward Ratsey replaced Woodridge.

After exchanges of fire first with Harrier and then with Phaeton, Sémillante took refuge under the guns of a shore battery. Unable to dislodge her, the two British vessels eventually sailed off, each having suffered two men wounded. Sémillante was reported to have suffered 13 killed and 36 wounded. After resupplying at San Jacinto, Sémillante intended to sail for Mexico in March 1805 to fetch specie for the Philippines; the encounter with Phaeton and Harrier foiled the plan. Motard returned to the Indian Ocean, operating for the next three years against British shipping from Île de France.

In 1806 Lieutenant Edward Troubridge took command. She was armed with eight guns and carried a crew of 80 men. Christian Elizabeth was sheltering under the guns of Fort Manado.

Greyhound and Harrier then sailed across the Molucca Sea to the island of Tidon in the Celebes. There, on 6 July, they captured another enemy ship, Belgica. She was armed with 12 guns and had a crew of 32 men.

Greyhound and Harrier continued their cruise westward until the evening of 25 July when, in the Salayer Strait, they sighted four ships. The next morning they were able to bring the Dutch squadron to action.

After 40 minutes of an exchange of fire the Dutch frigate Pallas struck to Greyhound. Harrier engaged the two merchant vessels, Victoria and Batavier, which struck to her. The fourth Dutch vessel, the corvette William, which had not been engaged, escaped. Casualties on Pallas were heavy, with eight men killed outright and 32 wounded, including her captain and three of his lieutenants. Six of the wounded later died, including the Dutch captain. There were also four men killed on the East Indiamen and seven wounded, one of whom died later. British losses by contrast were light, with one man killed and eight wounded on Greyhound and just three wounded on Harrier.

Robson and a party of lascars had reached Ambonya where the governor had treated them with great kindness and hospitality, and put them on Pallas.

Prize crews took the three captured ships to Port Cornwallis on South Andaman Island. Troubridge received promotion to commander in September, and assumed command of HMS Celebes, the former Pallas. Commander William Wilbrahim replaced Troubridge in Harrier.

Between 1 and 3 February 1807 Harrier endured a hurricane of Madagascar on her way to the Cape of Good Hope. Blenheim was the flagship of Admiral Sir Thomas Troubridge, father of Edward Troubridge. One of the passengers on Blenheim was Elphinstone, who had been recalled to Britain. Harrier herself reached the Cape of Good Hope, but not without difficulty, and refitted there.

In 1807, Commander George Pigot replaced Wilbrahim in command of Harrier. Pigot was  superseded in turn by Commander Justice Finley (acting), at the Cape of Good Hope. Finley was captain of Harrier on 7 August 1807 when she captured the Helena.

Harrier, and  shared in the capture of the Jeune Laure on 5 March 1808.

Commander John James Ridge was captain of Harrier on 19 October 1808 when she captured the French ship Soeuffleur. Harrier, Nereide and  shared in the capture on 5 January 1809 of Goende Monche.

Fate
Harrier fell behind and was never seen again. She was presumed to have foundered with all hands.

See also
List of people who disappeared mysteriously at sea

Citations

References
 
 
 
 

1800s missing person cases
1804 ships
Cruizer-class brig-sloops
Maritime incidents in 1809
Missing ships
People lost at sea
Ships built in Deptford
Shipwrecks in the Indian Ocean
Warships lost with all hands